One World is the 19th studio album by American singer-songwriter John Denver. Released in June 1986, this was Denver's final studio album for RCA Records. The singles released from this album were "Along For The Ride ('56 T-Bird)" and "Let Us Begin (What Are We Making Weapons For)/"Flying For Me." "Let Us Begin" was later re-recorded in Russia with Alexander Gradsky. "Flying For Me" was written in honor of the passengers aboard the space shuttle Challenger.

Track listing
All tracks composed by John Denver; except where indicated

Side one
 "Love Is the Master" – 2:39
 "Love Again" – 2:50
 "I Remember You" – 2:48 (Johnny Mercer, Victor Schertzinger)
 "Hey There, Mr. Lonely Heart" – 3:55
 "Let Us Begin (What Are We Making Weapons For?)" – 5:54
 "Flying for Me" – 5:34

Side two
 "Along for the Ride ('56 T-Bird)" – 4:47 (Danny O'Keefe, Bill Braun)
 "I Can't Escape" – 3:36
 "True Love Takes Time" – 4:07 (Dik Darnell, Denver)
 "One World" – 4:09
 "It's a Possibility" – 3:11

Personnel
John Denver – guitar, vocals
Paulinho Da Costa – percussion
James Burton – guitar
Sid Sharp – concertmaster
Alf Clausen – orchestral arrangements
Glen Hardin – piano
Jerry Scheff – bass
Jerry Carrigan – drums
Dean Parks – guitar
Patti Austin – background singer
Conrad Reeder – background singer
Denny Brooks – background singer
Elizabeth Lamers – background singer

Charts

References

John Denver albums
1986 albums
RCA Records albums
Albums produced by Roger Nichols (recording engineer)